The Ruch is a river in Perm Krai, Russia, a left tributary of the Veslyana, which in turn is a tributary of the Kama. Main tributaries: Tuykos (right) and Chuklya (left).

References 

Rivers of Perm Krai